The Suamico River is a river in north east Wisconsin that flows through the village of Suamico and into Green Bay in Lake Michigan. The source is near the community of Anston, in the town of Pittsfield. The river has been dredged by the United States Army Corps of Engineers to aid in recreational activity.

See also
List of Wisconsin rivers

References

Rivers of Wisconsin